The British Association of Dermatologists is a charity established in 1920 whose charitable objects are the practice, teaching, training, and research of dermatology.  It produces the British Journal of Dermatology, a monthly peer-reviewed medical journal and organises annual conferences.

Notable presidents

References

External links
British Association of Dermatologists

Dermatology organizations
Health in the London Borough of Camden
Medical associations based in the United Kingdom
1920 establishments in the United Kingdom
Organisations based in the London Borough of Camden
Presidents of the British Association of Dermatologists